Crush Music is a New York City and Los Angeles-based musician management company that manages Sia, Green Day, Panic! at the Disco, Lorde, Train, Weezer, and Fall Out Boy amongst others. The company was founded by Jonathan Daniel, formerly of Electric Angels and several other glam rock bands, and Bob McLynn, formerly of The Step Kings.

Current clients

Alanis Morissette
Andrew McMahon in the Wilderness
Butch Walker
Courtney Love
Fall Out Boy
Green Day
Jewel
Lennon Stella
LOLO
Lorde
Lykke Li
Matt Nathanson
MARINA
Miley Cyrus
Miike Snow
Panic! at the Disco
Regina Spektor
Rick Springfield
Sia
Terrace Martin
The B-52's
Thunderstorm Artis
Train
Weezer

Former clients
The Academy Is...
The Cab
Cobra Starship
Destroy Rebuild Until God Shows
Four Year Strong
Gym Class Heroes
Hey Monday
The Hush Sound
New Politics
Marina Diamandis
MAX
Millionaires
Travie McCoy
Tyga

Producers, writers, and arrangers
Jonny Coffer
Ilsey Juber
Morgan Kibby
Jake Sinclair
Suzy Shinn
Andrew Wyatt

References

External links
 Crush Management

Crush Management artists
Entertainment companies of the United States